Do Dil Bandhe Ek Dori Se (English: Two Hearts Connected By One Thread) is an Indian television drama, which premiered on 12 August 2013. The show was aired on Zee TV Monday through Friday nights. The show was musically treated by Dony Hazarika. it replaced Hitler Didi.  it was replaced by Jamai Raja  in its timeslot.

Plot

The story revolves around a young woman named Shivani whose parents die in a plane crash. She is left in the care of her paternal grandfather, Daaju, who grows overprotective of her. Daaju believes that he can control Shivani's life and protect her from all harm. He wants to plan Shivani's future, including her wedding.

Raghu is Daaju's servant. Shivani calls Raghu a magician since he always fulfils her wishes. Daaju has arranged Shivani's marriage with her childhood sweetheart, Abimanyu, unaware of Abhimanyu's evil intentions.  Abhimanyu wants to marry Shivani so that he can inherit Daaju's wealth and property. Once Shivani and Raghu find out about Abhimanyu's motives, they fake marrying each other to thwart Abhimanyu's plans.

Shivani gets a taste of the real world through their fake marriage   raghu and shivani start to fall for each other,and realises that life is not as comfortable and beautiful as Daaju had exposed her to. Gradually, Raghu and Shivani grow to love one another despite many hurdles, and their marriage transforms into a real one.

Cast
 Arhaan Behll as Raghu Seharia 
 Mansi Srivastava as Shivani Rana / Shivani Raghu Seharia
 Yashashri Masurkar as Sumitra 
 Alok Nath as Balwant Rana "Daaju", Shivani's Grandfather
 Vikas Sethi as Jaswant Rana
 Snigdha Pandey as Bela Seharia
 Rucha Gujarathi as Mahima Jaswant Rana 
 Chaitanya Choudhury as Veer Pratap Singh
 Shriya Jha as Madhavi Veer Pratap Singh
 Anju Mahendru as Renuka 
 Perneet Chauhan as Sumitra 
 Ravi Bhatia as Vivek Seharia
 Bhanujeet Sudan as Rohit Seharia
 Ishrat Ali as Baburam
 Shubhangi Latkar as Lata
 Puru Chibber as Karan
 Poonampreet Bhatia as Maya 
 Shalu Shreya as Ginni
 Akshat Gupta as Abhimanyu Sanghvi, Shivani's Boyfriend 
 Pankaj Bhatia as Rupesh
 Charu Rohtagi as Panna Dai
 Vishal Thakkar as Sumitra's Fiance
Ahmad Harhash as Sanjay Singh

Special appearance 
 Akhil Mishra in Cameo
 Suhasi Goradia Dhami & Narayani Shastri
 Jay Bhanushali & Mahhi Vij
 Surbhi Tiwari

References

External links

 

Indian television soap operas
2013 Indian television series debuts
Zee TV original programming
Hindi-language television shows
Indian drama television series